|}

This is a list of electoral district results for the 1923 Queensland state election.

At the time, the voting system in Queensland was based on contingency voting, which was similar to the modern optional preferential voting system. In electorates with 3 or more candidates, preferences were not distributed if a candidate received more than 50% of the primary vote.

If none received more than 50%, all except the top two candidates were eliminated from the count and their preferences distributed between the two leaders, with the one receiving the most votes declared the winner.

Results by electoral district

Albert

Aubigny

Balonne

Barcoo

Bowen

Bremer

Brisbane

Bulimba

Bundaberg

Buranda

By-election 

 This by-election was caused by the appointment of John Huxham as Agent-General of Queensland in London. It was held on 16 August 1924.

Burke

Burnett

Burrum

Cairns

Carnarvon

Charters Towers

Chillagoe

By-election 

 This by-election was caused by the resignation of Ted Theodore, who entered Federal politics. It was held on 16 January 1926.

Cook

Cooroora

Cunningham

Dalby

Eacham

By-election 

 This by-election was caused by the resignation of William Gillies. It was held on 16 January 1926.

East Toowoomba

Enoggera

Fassifern

Fitzroy

Flinders

Fortitude Valley

Gregory

Gympie

Herbert

Ipswich

Ithaca

Kelvin Grove

Kennedy

Keppel

Kurilpa

Leichhardt

Lockyer

Logan

Mackay

Maranoa

Maree

Maryborough

Merthyr

Mirani

Mitchell

Mount Morgan

Mundingburra

Murilla

Murrumba

Nanango

Normanby 

 Jens Peterson was the sitting Labor MP in the 1920 election, but defected to the United party to contest the 1923 election.

Nundah

Oxley

Paddington

Port Curtis

Queenton

Rockhampton

Rosewood

Sandgate

South Brisbane

Stanley

Toombul

Toowong

Toowoomba

By-election 

 This by-election was caused by the appointment of Frank Brennan to the Supreme Court. It was held on 4 April 1925.

Townsville

Warrego

By-election 

 This by-election was caused by the resignation of Harry Coyne. It was held on 13 October 1923.

Warwick

Wide Bay

Windsor

Wynnum

See also 

 1923 Queensland state election
 Candidates of the Queensland state election, 1923
 Members of the Queensland Legislative Assembly, 1923-1926

References 

Results of Queensland elections